The Iceland International in badminton is an international open held in Iceland since 1986. The tournament belongs to the European Badminton Circuit. In 2008, the event had to be cancelled due to the 2008–2011 Icelandic financial crisis.

Previous winners

Performances by nation

References

Badminton tournaments
Badminton tournaments in Iceland
Sports competitions in Iceland
Recurring sporting events established in 1986